Uche Chukwumerije , (11 January 1939 – 19 April 2015), popularly referred to as "Comrade Chukwumerije" because of his lifelong socialist beliefs,  was elected a senator of the Federal Republic of Nigeria in April 2003, representing Abia North Senatorial District.

Early life 
Chukwumerije was born on 11 January 1939 in Ogoja, in present day Cross River State of Nigeria, to Sergeant Ogbonna Chukwumerije (popularly called Sarji) and his third wife Mrs Egejuru Chukwumerije, both hailing from Isuochi in present day Abia State of Nigeria. He was the 4th of his mother's eight children: Daniel, Roland, Ahamefula (Joe), Ucheruaka, Ifeyinwa, Rosa, Ochi, Onyekozuoro (Onyex).

Education 
He attended Methodist Central School, Nkwoagu, Isuochi, Abia State, 1943–52; Our Lady's High School, Onitsha, 1953–57; University College Ibadan, 1958–61, where he majored in Economics; Faith Bible College, Sango-Ota, 1991-92.

Early career
Head Features Desk, DailyTimes, 1961; News Desk, Nigerian Broadcasting Corporation (now FRCN);

Political career 
Chukwumerije served as Minister of Information and Culture under General Ibrahim Babangida and under the Interim National Government of Ernest Shonekan.

Senate
In the Fourth Republic, Chukwumerije was elected to the Senate on the Peoples Democratic Party's platform, but he fell out of favor with the party's leadership when he opposed the Third Term Agenda. Chukwumerije eventually decamped to the Progressive Peoples Alliance in 2006, and was reelected to the Senate on April 28, 2007.

Chukwumerije was reelected on the PDP platform in the April 2011 elections. He died in office of lung cancer in 2015.

Family
Chukwumerije was married to Princess Gloria N. Iweka. They had eight children: Che Chidi (1974-), Kwame Ekwueme (1975-1995), Azuka Juachi (1976-), Dikeogu Egwuatu (1979-), Chaka Ikenna (1980-), Uchemruaka Obinna (1982-), and the twins Kelechi Udoka (1983-) and Chikadibia Yagazie (1983-). Chukwumerije and Princess Iweka were divorced in 1988. One of their sons Chika won a bronze medal at the 2008 Olympic Games in Beijing. Another son, Dike, is an acclaimed Nigerian writer, public speaker and performance poet.

References
Mantu listens to remote controlled voices from Aso Rock— Chukwumerije
Official Bio from the National Assembly

1939 births
2015 deaths
Igbo politicians
People from Abia State
Progressive Peoples Alliance politicians
Peoples Democratic Party members of the Senate (Nigeria)
Federal ministers of Nigeria
21st-century Nigerian politicians
University of Ibadan alumni